The Carmarthenshire League (currently the LTC Mobility Carmarthenshire Association Football League) is a football league in Carmarthenshire, West Wales, sitting at the fifth, sixth and seventh levels of the Welsh football league system.

Teams promoted from the Premier Division may enter the West Wales Premier League if standards and facilities fall into line with the regulations of the Welsh Football League.

History

Clubs who have played in the Welsh Football League
The following teams from the league went on to play in the Welsh Football League:
 Garden Village
 Porth Tywyn Suburbs

Member clubs for 2022–23 season
The following clubs were members of the league.

Premier Division

Burry Port
Bwlch Rangers
Felinfoel
Gorseinon Athletic
Killay
Loughor Rovers
Pengelli United
Pontlliw
Pwll Athletic 
Seaside
Trallwm
Trostre Sports

Division One

Bancffosfelen
Caerbryn 
Camford Sports
Dafen Welfare reserves 
Drefach
Evans & Williams reserves
FC Carmarthen
Kidwelly Town
Llandovery
Llangennech
Pembrey
Tumble United

Division Two

Abergwili 
Ammanford development
CK Swiss Valley reserves
Crown Park Suburbs
Ferryside
Johnstown
K.R.U.F.
Llandeillo Town
Llanerch Rovers
Llansteffan
Pontarddulais Town reserves
West End United

League Champions
Since the league began the following clubs have been the senior champions of the league:

1920s

 1925–26: Dafen Welfare
 1926–27:
 1927–28:
 1928–29:
 1929–30:

1930s

 1930–31:
 1931–32:
 1932–33: Morfa United
 1933–34: Halfway United
 1934–35: Gorsddu Rangers
 1935–36: Dafen Welfare
 1936–37: Gorsddu Rangers
 1937–38: Bwlch Rangers
 1938–39: Cathan Stars
 1939–40: No competition

1940s

 1940–41: No competition
 1941–42: No competition
 1942–43: Loughor Rovers
 1943–44: No competition
 1944–45: No competition
 1945–46: Pontyates
 1946–47: Dafen Welfare
 1947–48: Dafen Welfare
 1948–49: Ponthenry
 1949–50: Bwlch Rangers

1950s

 1950–51: Dafen Welfare
 1951–52: Dafen Welfare
 1952–53: Bwlch Rangers
 1953–54: Bwlch Rangers
 1954–55: Babcock & Wilcox
 1955–56: Trostre Sports 
 1956–57: Bwlch Rangers
 1957–58: Bwlch Rangers / Llanelli Steel (shared)
 1958–59: Llanelli Steel
 1959–60: Llanelli A

1960s

 1960–61: Llanelli A
 1961–62: Llanelli A
 1962–63: Llanelli Steel
 1963–64: Ammanford United
 1964–65: Llanelli Steel
 1965–66: Llanelli Steel
 1966–67: Pengelli United
 1967–68: Llanelli Steel
 1968–69: Llanelli Steel
 1969–70: Llanelli Steel

1970s

 1970–71: Pengelli United
 1971–72: Llanelli A
 1972–73: Gorseinon Athletic
 1973–74: Gorseinon Athletic
 1974–75: Gorseinon Athletic
 1975–76: Gorseinon Athletic
 1976–77: Llanelli Steel
 1977–78: Llanelli Steel
 1978–79: Llanelli Steel
 1979–80: Garden Suburbs

1980s

 1980–81: Ammanford Athletic
 1981–82: Gorseinon Athletic
 1982–83: Gorseinon Athletic
 1983–84: Garden Suburbs
 1984–85: Dafen Welfare
 1985–86: Gorseinon Athletic
 1986–87: Gorseinon Athletic
 1987–88: Trostre Sports 
 1988–89: Trostre Sports 
 1989–90: Garden Suburbs

1990s

 1990–91: Gorseinon Athletic
 1991–92: Trostre Sports 
 1992–93: Llanelli Steel
 1993–94: Trallwm
 1994–95: Trostre Sports 
 1995–96: Penyfan United
 1996–97: Trostre Sports 
 1997–98: Trostre Sports 
 1998–99: Trostre Sports 
 1999–2000: Bwlch Rangers

2000s

 2000–01: Camford Sports
 2001–02: Trostre Sports 
 2002–03: Seaside
 2003–04: Seaside
 2004–05: Seaside
 2005–06: Trostre Sports 
 2006–07: Trostre Sports 
 2007–08: Seaside
 2008–09: Seaside
 2009–10: Seaside

2010s

 2010–11: Seaside
 2011–12: Seaside
 2012–13: Seaside
 2013–14: Seaside
 2014–15: Evans & Williams
 2015–16: Seaside
 2016–17: Trostre Sports 
 2017–18: Bwlch Rangers
 2018–19: Trallwm
 2019–20: Trostre Sports

2020s

 2020–21: Season void
 2021–22: Trostre Sports

Number of titles by winning clubs since 1930s

Trostre Sports – 14 titles
Llanelli Steel – 12 titles (including 1 shared)
Seaside – 11 tiles
Gorseinon Athletic – 9 titles
Bwlch Rangers – 8 titles (including 1 shared)
Dafen Welfare – 6 titles (plus 1 in the 1920s)
Llanelli A – 4 titles
Garden Suburbs – 3 titles
Ammanford United – 2 titles
Gorsddu Rangers – 2 titles
Pengelli United –  2 titles
Trallwm –  2 titles
Ammanford Athletic – 1 title
Babcock & Wilcox – 1 title
Camford Sports – 1 title
Cathan Stars – 1 title
Evans & Williams – 1 title
Halfway United – 1 title
Loughor Rovers – 1 title
Morfa United – 1 title
Penyfan United – 1 title
Ponthenry – 1 title
Pontyates – 1 title

Cup competitions
A number of annual competitions are competed for:

 Carmarthenshire Senior Cup
 T G Davies Cup
 Challenge Cup
 Darch Cup 
 Morris Cup 
 J Stephens Cup

See also
Football in Wales
List of football clubs in Wales

References

External links
League website
West Wales FA - Carmarthenshire Association

 
Wales
Sport in Carmarthenshire
Sixth level football leagues in Europe
Football leagues in Wales